At the 1908 Summer Olympics, a tug of war tournament was contested. Each team consisted of 8 athletes. Nations could enter up to 3 teams. The host Great Britain was the only one to enter more than one (entering the maximum of 3 teams). Germany, Greece, Sweden, and the United States each entered one team apiece, though Germany and Greece withdrew. This left 5 teams (40 athletes) from 3 nations to compete.

Medal table

Medal summary

Team rosters

Great Britain

City of London Police

 Edward Barrett
 Frederick Goodfellow
 Frederick Humphreys
 William Hirons
 Albert Ireton
 Frederick Merriman
 Edwin Mills
 John James Shepherd

Liverpool Police

 Charles Foden (captain)
 James Clarke
 Thomas Butler
 William Greggan
 Alexander Kidd
 Daniel McDonald Lowey
 Patrick Philbin
 George Smith
 Thomas Swindlehurst

Metropolitan Police "K" Division

 Walter Chaffe
 Joseph Dowler
 Ernest Ebbage
 Thomas Homewood
 Alexander Munro
 William Slade
 Walter Tammas
 James Woodget

Sweden

 Albrekt Almqwist
 Frans Fast
 Carl-Emil Johansson
 Emil Johansson
 Knut Johansson
 Karl Krook
 Karl-Gustaf Nilsson
 Anders Wollgarth

United States

 Wilbur Burroughs
 Wesley Coe
 Arthur Dearborn
 John Flanagan
 Bill Horr
 Matt McGrath
 Ralph Rose
 Lee Talbott

Results

Quarterfinals
The German and Greek teams withdrew, narrowing the seven-team field to five. Thus, the Swedish team and two of the British squads had byes in the quarterfinals.
  
The only match held was between the Liverpool team and the Americans. Liverpool won the first pull easily, after which the United States delegation protested against the footwear worn by the Liverpool police, who competed in their service boots. The protest was dismissed, and the Americans withdrew in disgust.

Semifinals

Liverpool again faced a foreign opponent, and again prevailed. The two London services squared off in the other semifinal, with the City police beating the Metropolitan men in a lengthy first pull. The second pull was not as tight a contest.

Final

The Londoners defeated Liverpool in the final, winning the first two pulls.

Bronze medal match
The Swedish team did not appear for the bronze medal match.

Notes

Sources
 
 
 Rosters

External links
 

 
1908 Summer Olympics events
1908
1908 in tug of war
History of the Metropolitan Police
History of the City of London Police